Melvin Smalls, known professionally as Drag-On, is an American rapper. He is best known for his time on Ruff Ryders, through whom he released his debut album, Opposite of H2O (2000). The album was successful, debuting at number five on the US Billboard 200 chart and eventually sold over 500,000 copies and earning a Gold certification from the Recording Industry Association of America (RIAA). After leaving Interscope Records, which issued his debut alongside Ruff Ryders, Drag-On joined Virgin Records and released his second album Hell and Back, in 2004.

Drag-On has appeared in the 2001 film Exit Wounds and the 2003 Cradle 2 the Grave, both of which stars his then-Ruff Ryders label-mate DMX.

Discography

Studio albums

Singles

As lead artist

Guest appearances

References

External links 
 

Year of birth missing (living people)
African-American male rappers
American male film actors
Interscope Records artists
Living people
Male actors from New York City
Rappers from the Bronx
Ruff Ryders artists
Virgin Records artists
East Coast hip hop musicians
African-American songwriters
Songwriters from New York (state)
Underground rappers
Gangsta rappers
21st-century American rappers
21st-century American male musicians
21st-century African-American musicians
20th-century African-American people
American male songwriters